Oswego County Airport  is a county-owned, public-use airport three nautical miles (6 km) northeast of the central business district of Fulton, in Oswego County, New York, United States. The airport is located in Volney, New York.

The airport is home to a flight school and also has charter services available for local residents. Short and long-term tie-downs, as well as hangar rentals, are available to aircraft owners. Organizations based at the airport include an Experimental Aircraft Association chapter and a Civil Air Patrol squadron. In 1999, Phish performed their summer festival, Camp Oswego, at the airport.

Although most U.S. airports use the same three-letter location identifier for the FAA and IATA, this airport is assigned FZY by the FAA but has no designation from the IATA.

Facilities and aircraft 
It has two asphalt paved runways: 6/24 is 3,996 by 100 feet (1,218 x 30 m) and 15/33 is 5,197 by 100 feet (1,584 x 30 m).

For the 12-month period ending October 8, 2009, the airport had 20,550 aircraft operations, an average of 56 per day: 97% general aviation, 2% air taxi, and 1% military. At that time there were 68 aircraft based at this airport: 93% single-engine, 4% multi-engine, 1% jet and 1% ultralight.

References

External links 
 Oswego County Airport
 Experimental Aircraft Association, Chapter 486
 Civil Air Patrol of Oswego County
 Aerial photo as of 22 April 1994 from USGS The National Map
 

Airports in New York (state)
Transportation buildings and structures in Oswego County, New York